The Islamic Council of Queensland (ICQ), established in 1969, an Australian Muslim organisation acting as the central representative body for the Muslim community and local Islamic organisations in Queensland, Australia. The Council provides a number of social and religious services for Muslims in the area.

Activities

Community
The Islamic Council of Queensland represents more than 20,000 Muslims residing in the state of Queensland. The council also represents some 16 member organisations located in a number of cities in the state. The vast majority of mosques, mussallahs and Muslim student associations at universities are members of the organisation stretching from the Gold Coast up to Cairns.

Services and programs
The ICQ provides a number welfare services and Islamic ritual services for local Muslims in Queensland including marriage celebrants and  burial services. The group has organised annual Quran competitions and other programs for youth development. The group has also organised a number of workshops and fund raising events.

In 2008, young members of the ICQ organised a successful public relations campaign when they participated in Blood Donation Week, donating blood to Queensland blood banks.

According to the Council, the Islamic community in Queensland have suffered from a number of prejudicial incidents locally, and have felt the strain on their daily lives. The Council president has attributed some of these problems to the fact that local Australians are not familiar with the religion and culture of local Muslims. The ICQ and Queensland’s Islamic community have planned an annual "Queensland Mosque Day" to encourage Australian locals to learn about the Muslim faith. The Queensland Premier, Campbell Newman, encouraged locals to attend the open session.

Zakaat and halal accreditation
The ICQ collects and distributes zakaat and provides halal accreditation.

Organisational structure

Executive committee
The executive committee is responsible for the governance of the Council. Members of the executive committee are selected through the AGM process and represent the variety of different ethnic, cultural and linguistic groups within the Queensland Muslim community. The members of the 2019 executive committee are:
 Habib Jamal, President
 Farouk Adam, Vice President
 Muhammad Khatree, Secretary
 Imam Akram Buksh, Assistant Secretary
 Saba Ahammad, Treasurer
 Ahmad Gundru, Assistant Treasurer
 Ali Kadri, Official Spokesperson
 Janeth Deen OAM, Committee Member
 Binil Kattiparambil, Committee Member
 Junaid Qadri, Committee Member
 Amar Ali Khan, Committee Member
 Dr Usman Malabu, Committee Member

Member societies

Awards
In 2014, the Queensland state government awarded Professor Shahjahan Khan, former vice-president of ICQ, as a 2014 Cultural Diversity Ambassador award recipient.

See also
Islam in Australia

References

External links
 

1969 establishments in Australia
Islamic organisations based in Australia
Islamic organizations established in 1969
Organisations based in Brisbane